Krishna-Godavari Diocese is a diocese of Church of South India in Andrapradesh state of India. The diocese is one among the 22 dioceses of Church of South India.

About
The diocese covers the Krishna Godavari areas of Andhra Pradesh state. The headquarters of the diocese is at Machilipatnam.The Krishna-Godavari diocese is one of the largest diocese in Andhra Pradesh extending from Ongole District in the south through Srikakulam District in the northern part of Andhra Pradesh. The current bishop of the diocese is T. George Cornelius who is the new bishop of K.G.Diocese Church of South India.

Bishops

Prior to the formation of the Church of South India
 Vedanayagam Samuel Azariah

From the time of the formation of the Church of South India
 Yeddy Muthyalu (1947-1955)
 A. B. Elliott (1955-1961)
 N. D. Ananda Rao Samuel (1961–1980)
 T. B. D. Prakasa Rao (1981–2001)
 G. Dyvasirvadam (2002-2018)
 T. George Cornelious (2018-“present”)

Further reading

References

External links
CSI St.Paul's Centenary Church Vijayawada
St.John's & St.Paul's Church Visakapatnam
CSI All Saints Church Vijayawada

Krishna-Godavari
Christianity in Andhra Pradesh